Eaton is a former civil parish, now in the parishes of Eaton and Eccleston and Poulton and Pulford, within the borough of Cheshire West and Chester and the ceremonial county of Cheshire in England. It had a population of 51 in 2001.

It is most notable for containing Eaton Hall, home of the Duke of Westminster.

In 2015 the parish was merged with the adjacent parish Eccleston to form a new combined parish, Eaton and Eccleston; because of minor boundary changes, a small part also went to Poulton and Pulford.

Governance 
Eaton is represented by the Constituency of the City of Chester in the UK House of Commons.  It was previously represented by the Constituency of North West England in the European Parliament. It is represented on Cheshire West and Chester Borough Council which holds its meetings at Chester Town Hall. Since 2015 local government in Eaton has been divided between two civil parishes: 
 Eaton and Eccleston, governed by a seven-member parish council, with meetings held in the Eccleston Village Hall in the third week of January, May, July and October each year. There are also special meetings scheduled to deal with specific issues when needed.
 Poulton and Pulford, governed by a ten-member parish council, with meetings held in the Pulford Village Hall in the third week of January, May, July and October each year. There are also special meetings scheduled to deal with specific issues when needed.

See also

Listed buildings in Eaton, west Cheshire

References

External links

Former civil parishes in Cheshire
Cheshire West and Chester